John Eveleigh (c. 1511–1586), of Holcombe in Ottery St. Mary, Devon, was an English politician, a feodary and attorney. 

He was a Member (MP) of the Parliament of England for Totnes in April 1554 and for Tavistock in November 1554.

References

1511 births
1586 deaths
Members of the Parliament of England (pre-1707) for Totnes
English MPs 1554
English MPs 1554–1555